The SCAN 20 was a 1940s French flying-boat training monoplane designed and built by Société de Constructions Aéro-Navales de Port-Neuf (SCAN). The prototype was built in secret in 1941. It was hidden until the liberation of France and first flown in 1945.

Design and development
The SCAN 20 was designed to meet a French Air Ministry requirement for a small flying-boat trainer. The SCAN 20 was a high-wing cantilever monoplane flying-boat with strut-mounted floats under each wing. It had twin fin with rudders on a raised tailplane and an enclosed cockpit with side-by-side seating for two. Built in secret during 1941 it was not flown until after the liberation of France in October 1945. The prototype had a single  Béarn 6D inline engine strut-mounted above the wing. An order for 30 aircraft with a more powerful engine was placed for the French Navy but only 23 were delivered.

Operators

French Navy

Specifications

See also

References

 
 
 

1940s French military trainer aircraft
Flying boats
SCAN aircraft
Single-engined pusher aircraft
High-wing aircraft
Aircraft first flown in 1945